Syed Abdul Rahman Alsagoff was an Arab businessman in the spice trade, and a philanthropist who settled in Singapore. He was a descendant of the Islamic Prophet Muhammad.

Personal life 
Alsagoff was born in Hadhramawt, in present-day Yemen, Arabian Peninsula. He was Muhammad's thirty-third direct descendant, and had a son, that is Sayyid Ahmad. His residence in Singapore, described as "unusual", was located along Java Road.

Career 
Alsagoff arrived in Singapore in 1824, alongside his son. As such, Alsagoff is cited as the "first member of the Alsagoff Family to settle in Singapore". Trading mainly spices, his son later established the Alsagoff Company in 1848. Alsagoff was successful in his career, and "dominated the spice trade in the region". He also promoted the welfare of other people.

See also 
 Arab Singaporeans
 Alsagoff Family
 Hajjah Fatimah
 Sharif Ali ibn Ajlan ibn Rumaithah ibn Muhammad
 Sharif ul-Hashim of Sulu

References 

Hadhrami people
Yemeni emigrants to Singapore